Oumar Koné or Oumar Konemay refer to:

Oumar Basakoulba Kone, paralympic athlete, competed 1996–2008
 Oumar Koné (judoka) (born 1985), Malian judoka
 Oumar Koné (footballer) (born 1991), Malian footballer

See also
 Oumou Kone (born 1999), female Malian footballer